Syllomatia pirastis is a species of moth of the family Tortricidae. It is found in Australia, where it has been recorded from South Australia and Tasmania. The habitat consists of open forests.

The wingspan is about 18 mm.

The larvae feed on Lomatia tinctoria. They tie the terminal leaves of their host plant, forming a frass-packed shelter.

References

Moths described in 1910
Tortricinae